Euxoa aquilina is a moth of the family Noctuidae. It is found in the Mediterranean region of Europe, North Africa, the Near East and the Middle East.

Description
Larger than Euxoa tritici  and dull brown, with luteous instead of white scaling, the costa generally paler.

Subspecies
Euxoa aquilina aquilina
Euxoa aquilina falleri (Corsica, Sardinia)

Biology
Adults are on wing from May to October. There is one generation per year.

The larvae feed subterraneous on roots of Poaceae species and other herbivorous plants.Dry meadows.

References

External links
The Noctuinae of Israel(Lepidoptera: Noctuidae)

Euxoa
Moths of Europe
Moths of Asia
Moths of the Middle East
Moths described in 1775